The individual dressage at the 1952 Summer Olympics took place between 28 and 29 July, at the Ruskeasuo Equestrian Hall. The event was open to women for the first time; of the 27 riders, 4 were female—including silver medalist Lis Hartel.

Competition format
The team and individual dressage competitions used the same results. Competitors were given 15 minutes to complete their corresponding tests. For each second over the 15-minute mark, contestants lost half a point.

Results

References

External links
Official Olympic Report, la84.org.

Equestrian at the 1952 Summer Olympics